Todd Matthew Van Poppel (born December 9, 1971) is a former Major League Baseball pitcher who played for the Oakland Athletics (–), Detroit Tigers (1996), Texas Rangers (–), Pittsburgh Pirates (1998), Chicago Cubs (–), and Cincinnati Reds (2003–).

Amateur career
Van Poppel was 11–3 with a 0.97 earned run average (ERA) and 170 strikeouts as a senior at Martin High School in Arlington, Texas. He was drafted in the first round, 14th overall, by the Athletics directly out of high school in the 1990 Major League Baseball Draft. The Atlanta Braves had seriously considered using the first overall selection on Van Poppel. However, when Van Poppel explicitly told the Braves he would not sign with them, the team opted instead to take future Hall of Fame player Chipper Jones.

Professional career
Van Poppel was the first of four starting pitchers selected by the A's in the first 36 picks of the 1990 draft, referred to at the time as "The Four Aces". The other three draftees were Don Peters, Dave Zancanaro and Kirk Dressendorfer. All four struggled with injuries after being drafted, and only Van Poppel and Dressendorfer ever reached the major leagues.

Because Van Poppel was signed to a major league contract rather than the standard minor league contract, the A's only had a limited number of minor league options they could use on him. By all accounts, his lack of seasoning in the minors cost both the A's and Van Poppel. He pitched just 37.2 innings in Single-A in 1990, spent 1991 at Double-A Huntsville, and was hurt for much of 1992 at Triple-A Tacoma before splitting time between Oakland and Tacoma in 1993. In all, he made only 32 minor league starts.

Armed with a blazing fastball that had little movement, Van Poppel struggled with the A's. His best season in Oakland was probably 1995, when he went 4–8 with a 4.88 ERA, splitting time as a starter and a reliever. He also notched 122 strikeouts (and 56 walks) in 138.1 innings that year.

In 1996, his numbers dropped sharply, and he was released by the A's mid-season. After unremarkable stops in Detroit, Texas and Pittsburgh, Van Poppel did have two successful years (2000 and 2001) as a middle reliever with the Cubs, before his effectiveness declined.

Van Poppel's career record was 40–52. He never won more than seven games in a season.

Retirement
Shortly after his retirement from baseball in 2005, Van Poppel announced he was investing in the Denton Outlaws, a Texas Collegiate League team. The Outlaws went on to win the league championship that year.

References

External links

1971 births
Living people
Baseball players from Chicago
Major League Baseball pitchers
Chicago Cubs players
Cincinnati Reds players
Detroit Tigers players
Oakland Athletics players
Pittsburgh Pirates players
Texas Rangers players
Sportspeople from Arlington, Texas
Southern Oregon A's players
Madison Muskies players
Huntsville Stars players
Tacoma Tigers players
Omaha Royals players
Charlotte Rangers players
Tulsa Drillers players
Iowa Cubs players
Oklahoma RedHawks players
Nashville Sounds players
Frisco RoughRiders players
Louisville Bats players
People from Hinsdale, Illinois
Martin High School (Arlington, Texas) alumni